James Bruce Walsh (born 1957) is an American geneticist whose research focuses on evolutionary and quantitative genetics. He has been Professor of Ecology and Evolutionary Biology at the University of Arizona since 1986. He discovered the moth species Lithophane leeae in 2009, and another moth species, Drasteria walshi, is named after him.

References

External links
 Home page
 

Living people
1957 births
American geneticists
University of Arizona faculty
University of California, Davis alumni
University of Washington alumni